Ned Ryan, is a former Irish sportsperson.  He played hurling with his local club Borris–Ileigh in the 1950s and was a member of the Tipperary senior inter-county team that won the Munster Senior Hurling Championship and the All-Ireland in 1950 and 1951.
He started both All-Ireland final's in the number ten position in the half forward line, and scored a goal in the 1951 All Ireland final against Wexford.

References

Year of birth missing
Possibly living people
Tipperary inter-county hurlers
Munster inter-provincial hurlers
Borris-Ileigh hurlers
All-Ireland Senior Hurling Championship winners